Lieutenant General Gösta Odqvist (9 January 1913 – 15 February 2005) was a Swedish Air Force officer. His senior commands include commanding officer of the Västmanland Wing (F 1), the Fourth Air Group (E 4), the Chief of the Air Staff and the First Air Group.

Early life
Odqvist was born on 9 January 1913 in Uppsala, Sweden, the son of lieutenant colonel Hjalmar Odqvist and his wife Ella (née Nordlöf). He grew up in Strängnäs where his father was an officer in the Södermanland Regiment (I 10). He passed studentexamen in 1932 and trained as an officer at the Military Academy Karlberg.

Career
Odqvist became an officer in 1935 and was commissioned as second lieutenant and assigned to Södermanland Regiment (I 10). The Swedish Air Force was now under strong construction, which attracted him. He joined the Air Force, underwent pilot training at the Swedish Air Force Flying School, finishing in 1937. He became lieutenant in the Air Force in 1939 and captain in 1942. Odqvist completed the staff course of the Royal Swedish Air Force Staff College from 1944 to 1945 and then served in the Air Staff. He was teacher at the Royal Swedish Air Force Staff College and the Artillery and Engineering College from 1944 to 1949 when he was promoted to major. Odqvist then served as chief of staff in the First Air Group from 1949 to 1951 and then as commanding officer of the Swedish Air Force Squadron Leader School (Flygvapnets bomb- och skjutskola, FBS) from 1951 to 1952 when he was promoted to lieutenant colonel.

Odqvist was commanding officer of the Flygvapnets krigsskola (F 20) from 1952 to 1954 and the Västmanland Wing (F 1) from 1954 to 1959. In 1955, Oqvist was promoted to colonel and from 1959 to 1961 he was Vice Chief of the Air Staff. He was appointed commanding officer of the Fourth Air Group (Fjärde flygeskadern, E 4) in 1961 and the year after he was promoted to major general. In 1964, Odqvist was appointed Chief of the Air Staff and in 1966 he was appointed commanding officer of the First Air Group. He left the position in 1973 and retired from active service and was then also promoted to lieutenant general.

After retirement, Västerås became his home town. He was unanimously elected to chairman of the F 1 Kamratförening, a position he held until 1990, when he became honorary chairman of the association. Odqvist was chairman of the Swedish Aviation Historical Society (Svensk flyghistorisk förening, SFF) from 1974 to 1978 and governor of the Rotary International's district 234 from 1979 to 1980. He became honorary member of the Swedish Aviation Historical Society in 1982.

Personal life
In 1938, Odqvist married Märta Sundell (1911–2003), the daughter of the Ernst Sundell and Elin (née Olsson). He was the father of Eva (born 1941), Kerstin (born 1944), Ulla (born 1946) and Inger (born 1947). His daughter Ulla, a diplomat, was one of the hostages of the 1975 AIA building hostage crisis in Kuala Lumpur.

The farm Kalfsund in Överenhörna socken was acquired by the Odqvist's in 1941.

Death
His wife Märta died on 13 August 2003 and he on 15 February 2005 in Västerås. They are buried at Överenhörna Church, a few kilometers from Kalfsund.

Dates of rank
1935 – Second lieutenant'' (Swedish Army)
1939 – Lieutenant (Swedish Air Force)
1942 – Captain
1949 – Major
1952 – Lieutenant colonel
1955 – Colonel
1962 – Major general
1973 – Lieutenant general

Awards and decorations

Swedish
  Commander Grand Cross of the Order of the Sword (5 June 1971)
   Commander 1st Class of the Order of the Sword (6 June 1962)
  Knight of the Order of Vasa
  Swedish Women's Voluntary Defence Organization Royal Medal of Merit in silver

Foreign
  Commander of the Order of the Crown of Thailand

Honours
Member of the Royal Swedish Academy of War Sciences (1960)

Bibliography

References

External links
Webpage about the Odqvist family 

1913 births
2005 deaths
Swedish Air Force lieutenant generals
People from Uppsala
Commanders Grand Cross of the Order of the Sword
Knights of the Order of Vasa
Members of the Royal Swedish Academy of War Sciences